Marek Jürgenson (born 9 September 1977 in Tartu) is an Estonian politician. He has been member of XIV Riigikogu.

In 2000 he graduated from University of Tartu in business administration.

2005-2009 he was the Elder of Tallinn Kesklinn District. 2012-2019 he was the Elder of Haabersti District.

Since 2003 he is a member of Estonian Central Party.

References

1977 births
Estonian Centre Party politicians
Living people
Members of the Riigikogu, 2019–2023
Politicians from Tartu
University of Tartu alumni